Don Parkinson may refer to:

Don Parkinson (politician), a lawyer and a politician in Guam.
Don Parkinson (1936-present), a New Zealand former rugby league footballer.

Disambiguation pages